The 2007 Odlum Brown Vancouver Open was a professional tennis tournament played on outdoor hard courts. It was the 3rd edition for men, and 6th edition for women, of the tournament and part of the 2007 ATP Challenger Series and the 2007 ITF Women's Circuit, offering totals of $100,000 for men, and $50,000 for women, in prize money. It took place in West Vancouver, British Columbia, between July 28 and August 5, 2007.

Men's singles main-draw entrants

Seeds

1 Rankings are as of July 25, 2007

Other entrants
The following players received wildcards into the singles main draw:
 Donald Young
 Phillip Simmonds
 Philip Bester
 Peter Polansky

The following player entered the singles main draw with a special exempt:
 Brian Wilson
 Milan Pokrajac

The following players received entry from the qualifying draw:
 Phillip King
 Nikita Kryvonos
 Colin Ebelthite
 Nicholas Monroe

Champions

Men's singles

 Frédéric Niemeyer def.  Sam Querrey, 4–6, 6–4, 6–3

Women's singles

 Anne Keothavong def.  Stéphanie Dubois, 7–5, 6–1

Men's doubles

 Rik de Voest /  Ashley Fisher def.  Donald Young /  Alex Kuznetsov, 6–1, 6–2

Women's doubles

 Stéphanie Dubois /  Marie-Ève Pelletier def.  Soledad Esperón /  Agustina Lepore, 6–4, 6–4

External links
Official website

References

Odlum Brown Vancouver Open
Odlum Brown Vancouver Open
Vancouver Open
Odlum Brown Vancouver Open
Odlum Brown Vancouver Open
Odlum Brown Vancouver Open